Henrique III Mpanzu a Nsindi a Nimi a Lukeni was ruler of the Kingdom of Kongo from the Kivuzi branch of the Kinlaza house, who reigned from 1840 until 1857. Henrique came to power when he overthrew his predecessor, André II. This was with the support of the elector Ntinu Nsaku. Henrique did not manage to kill Andre II and King Andre continued to exercise power from Mbanza Maputu over some of the Kongo realm.

Upon his death in 1857, the Kivuzu faction fractured.

Shortly after Henrique came to power a group of people who had formerly been enslaved to work for the Capuchin monastery started a rebellion against Henrique. This faction tried to place Henrique's nephew Alvaro Mabambo on the throne. They failed and Alvaro fled to his personal domains. Because the rebels had eccesiastical links Henrique asked for aid in pursuing and suppressing Alvaro and his supporters from the Portuguese colonial government of Angola, but this request was denied.

Henrique appointed his older brother as governor of Mbamba province. He gave his younger brother control of Wembo Province. He gave other supporters control of other provinces in the Kingdom. These provincial rulers built up their own local support networks and largely ran their government on their own, but did allow judicial appeals from their subjects to King Henrique III.

Henrique III sold many of the rebels he captured during civil wars into the trans-Atlantic slave trade. He resisted the efforts of Portuguese agents to discourage this trade, and with strong demand for new slaves from Brazil it continued under his watch. 1848 saw another civil war which had as a main consequence the continued exportation of people as slaves.

References

Manikongo of Kongo